Ischalis dugdalei is a species of moth in the family Geometridae. It was first described by Jason D. Weintraub and Malcolm J. Scoble in 2004. This species is endemic to New Zealand.

References

Ennominae
Moths of New Zealand
Moths described in 2004
Endemic fauna of New Zealand
Endemic moths of New Zealand